Almost Married may refer to:

Almost Married (1919 film), an American comedy-drama directed by Charles Swickard
Almost Married (1932 film), an American thriller directed by William Cameron Menzies
Almost Married (1942 film), an American film directed by Charles Lamont